Đekić (also transliterated Djekić) is a Serbian surname. It may refer to:

 Nemanja Đekić (born 1997), Serbian football player
 Branislav Đekić (born 1991), Serbian basketball player

See also
Đeković

Serbian surnames